Parel is the surname of:
 Anthony Parel (born 1926), Canadian historian
 Cristina Parel (died 2011), Filipina statistician
 Scott Parel (born 1965), American golfer

See also
 Parel (disambiguation)
 Het Wonderlijke leven van Willem Parel, 1955 Dutch comedy film whose title character has the surname Parel